The Sisserou Award of Honour is a national award of the Commonwealth of Dominica.  Created in 1967, it is the second highest honour presented by the President of the Commonwealth of Dominica on behalf of the state.  The Dominican Awards are sparingly presented with up to two Sisserou Awards of Honour being granted in any one year.

The award is named after the sisserou, the national bird of Dominica, which is unique to the island. The sisserou also appears on the national flag and coat of arms.

Insignia
The badge of the Sisserou Award of Honour is an oval-shaped golden coloured medallion.  The outer ring of the medallion bears the inscription in relief THE SISSEROU AWARD OF HONOUR.  The centre of the medallion depicts the Coat of arms of Dominica.

The breast medal is suspended from a ring attached at the top, and hangs from a yellow ribbon with a centre stripe of black bordered on its outside by white.

Grades : One grade

Notable recipients

 Anthony Bailey, interfaith campaigner
 Swinburne Lestrade, economist
 Ophelia Marie, singer
 Charles Savarin, President of Dominica

References

External links
 National Service Awards Register

Orders, decorations, and medals of Dominica
Awards established in 1967